Clifton Moor railway station was situated in England on the Eden Valley Railway between Penrith and Kirkby Stephen East. It served the village of Clifton. The station opened to passenger traffic on 1 August 1863, and was originally named 'Clifton'. The 'Moor' suffix was added on 1 September 1927. The station finally closed on 22 January 1962.

On one of the station's platforms a private waiting room was built for the "Yellow Earl of Lonsdale" who lived at nearby Lowther Castle.

To the west of the station was Eden Valley Junction where the Eden Valley Railway joined the Lancaster and Carlisle Railway (now part of the West Coast Main Line), south of the junction was at one time Clifton and Lowther railway station.

References

External links
Clifton Moor Station www.cumbria-railways.co.uk

Disused railway stations in Cumbria
Former North Eastern Railway (UK) stations
Railway stations in Great Britain opened in 1863
Railway stations in Great Britain closed in 1962
1863 establishments in England
1962 disestablishments in England
Clifton, Cumbria